Bierne is a commune in the Nord department in northern France.

History 
In 1436, Wautier de Ghistelles was seigneur d'Ekelsbeke et de Ledringhem (Lord of Esquelbecq and Ledringhem) and governor of La Madeleine hospital in Bierne.

Population

Heraldry

See also 
Communes of the Nord department

References 

Communes of Nord (French department)
French Flanders